The National Highway 90 or the N-90 is one of Pakistan National Highway running from town of Khwazakhela in Swat District to the town of Besham in Shangla District in the Khyber Pakhtunkhwa province of Pakistan. The highway connects Malakand Division with the Karakoram Highway at Besham. Its total length is 64 km, the highway is maintained and operated by Pakistan's National Highway Authority.

See also

References

External links
 National Highway Authority

Roads in Pakistan